Nicola Sartori (born 17 July 1976) is an Italian rower who won a bronze medal in the double sculls event at the 2000 Summer Olympics, together with teammate Giovanni Calabrese.

References

External links
 

1976 births
Living people
Italian male rowers
Rowers at the 2000 Summer Olympics
Olympic rowers of Italy
Olympic bronze medalists for Italy
Olympic medalists in rowing
Medalists at the 2000 Summer Olympics
World Rowing Championships medalists for Italy
Rowers of Fiamme Oro